Orsha Airport (previously named Balbasovo Airbase, given as Balbasava, Bolbasovo, Orsha Southwest, and Orsha) is a commercial airport in Belarus, located 11 km southwest of Orsha.  It has a long runway, large tarmac area, a terminal building, 3 commercial remote stands, and 30 large revetments.   A remote revetment area contains 5 bomber pads and probably 5 fighter pads. 

The airport is also home to  the Orsha Aircraft Repair Plant (OARP).

It was home to 402nd Heavy Bomber Aviation Regiment (402 TBAP) flying Tupolev Tu-22M3 (ASCC: Backfire) aircraft as recently as 1993. The 402 TBAP's division headquarters were 326 TBAD at Soltsy-2.

Its IATA code TXC was assigned in late 2021, in preparation of taking up commercial air transport operations.

References

Airports in Belarus
Soviet Air Force bases
Soviet Long Range Aviation
Military installations of Belarus
Belarusian Air Force